Eddie Stobart Group is a British multimodal logistics company, with interests in road haulage, rail freight, deep sea and inland waterway transport systems and deep sea port, inland port and rail connected storage facilities, along with transport, handling and warehousing facilities in the United Kingdom, Ireland and Belgium. The company has its operational head office in Warrington, Cheshire.

Started by Eddie Stobart in the end of the 1940s as an agricultural business in Cumbria, the company has diversified into rail and other logistics activities. Since 2014 it has been either wholly owned or partly owned by an investment entity known as Eddie Stobart Logistics: that entity changed its name to Logistics Development Group in February 2021.

On 1 July 2021, Culina Group purchased 100% of the share capital of GreenWhiteStar Acquisitions Limited (the holding company of the Eddie Stobart Group) for an undisclosed amount from DBAY Advisors (51%) and the Logistics Development Group (49%).

History

The business was started by Eddie Stobart in the late 1940s as an agricultural business in Cumbria. His son, Edward Stobart Junior, started working for his father's contracting business delivering agricultural material in the region. The first truck bought by Eddie Stobart in 1960 was painted post-office red and Brunswick green with yellow lettering. These colours were used for subsequent vehicles up to 1969. The company was incorporated as Eddie Stobart Ltd. on 23 November 1970 as a haulage firm, and Eddie Stobart controlled the organisation fully until 1973, when, at the age of 19, Edward Stobart took the place of CEO. In 1976, Eddie retired and Edward took full control of the road haulage business and the name Eddie Stobart Ltd in 1976, becoming Chairman.

By 1985 Edward Stobart owned 26 vehicles. The business was characterised by its Tautliner bodies. As part of a policy to maintain brand image, in the 1980s, the company had a policy that all drivers must wave back and honk their horn in the traditional truck-driver fashion when signalled by a passer-by or "Eddie spotter" to do so.
 
On 1 April 1987, the company opened its first depot in the English Midlands (at Burnaston).
 
By 2002 the company was experiencing financial difficulties caused by the fuel crisis. In 2001 the haulage business had posted its first loss, with the fan club making more money than the haulage business.
 
On 15 October 2003 it was announced that Eddie Stobart was to be sold to WA Developments, a civil engineering company that specialised in railway maintenance, based in Appleby-in-Westmorland, Cumbria. At the time, Eddie Stobart was 55% owned by Edward Stobart and 45% owned by his brother William. WA Developments was 27% owned by William and 73% owned by William's school friend, brother-in-law and business partner Andrew Tinkler. In effect, therefore, William Stobart's stake in Eddie Stobart reduced from 45% to 27%.

After a series of takeovers, the Stobart company developed from a haulage company to a logistics company known as the Stobart Group, obtaining a stock market listing without an IPO through a reverse takeover of the property and ports company the Westbury Property Fund in 2007.
 
On 10 March 2008 the company announced the acquisition of James Irlam & Sons Ltd, one of the largest independently owned road transport logistics providers in the UK for £59.9 million.
 
On 1 April 2008 the company started its first dedicated operations in Ireland, Stobart Ireland, based in Dublin, following the acquisition of TDG's Irish trailer operations.

On 14 September 2009, MP David Taylor officially opened the firm's Nestlé distribution centre in Bardon, Coalville, Leicestershire, after a £7 million refurbishment. The new site previously owned by Innovate Logistics. In July 2008 it was announced that the group had taken over the chilled and ambient goods distribution operations from the administrators of Innovate Logistics Limited, saving the jobs of around 1,300 Innovate employees.

The company completed the acquisition of Autologic, car-transporter firm, in August 2012.

In March 2014 Stobart Group announced its intention to re-position itself as an support services business, with the announcement of the sale of its original transport and distribution business to Dbay Advisors Limited (formerly Douglas Bay Capital) for £280.8 million: Dbay Advisors secured an indirect 49% stake in the logistics business. However, Stobart Group retained the rights to the brand Eddie Stobart, licensing it out to Eddie Stobart Logistics. In December 2019, DBay Advisors increased its indirect stake to 51%.

On 21 May 2020, the company announced that it was acquiring the intellectual property rights to the "Eddie Stobart" and "Stobart" brand names for £10 million from Stobart Group to increase its brand awareness. The deal also included the merchandise business and the Stobart Members Club. In February 2021 Eddie Stobart Logistics changed its name to Logistics Development Group.

On 1 July 2021, Culina Group purchased 100% of the share capital of GreenWhiteStar Acquisitions Limited (the holding company of the Eddie Stobart Group) for an undisclosed amount from DBAY Advisors (51%) and Logistics Development Group (49%).

In September 2021 a Stobart driver in Glasgow deliberately crashed into his ex-girlfriend's house, causing damage.

Ownership
Between 2014 and 2021 the business was either wholly owned or partly owned by an investment entity known as Eddie Stobart Logistics: that entity changed its name to Logistics Development Group in February 2021. DBAY Advisors (51%) and Logistics Development Group (49%) sold their combined 100% interest in the Eddie Stobart business to Culina Group in July 2021.

Headquarters
The company relocated their headquarters further down the M6 motorway to the Stretton Green Distribution Park, Warrington.

Current operations

Eddie Stobart
The largest part of Eddie Stobart Logistics is the original Eddie Stobart road haulage business with 2,700 vehicles.

General road haulage
Eddie Stobart Logistics uses a "pay per mile" system to charge clients, as opposed to a fixed payment system. In May 2007 Eddie Stobart was the subject of controversy when it reportedly offered bonuses to its Carlisle-based drivers to work in Livingston in Scotland, to transport goods for Tesco who were in dispute with their distribution centre drivers and facing disruption to their supply chain. The Stobart drivers refused to cross the Livingston picket line.

Fuel
The Eddie Stobart fleet includes a number of Volvo FM dual fuel trucks, running primarily on liquid natural gas, with diesel as a backup.

Vehicle naming

Eddie Stobart has a long tradition of giving its trucks female names. The first four owned by Eddie Stobart were named after model "Twiggy" and singers "Tammy" (Wynette), "Dolly" (Parton) and "Suzi" (Quatro). The practice has been expanded to cover other Stobart vehicles, including their sponsored sports cars and the Stobart Rail locomotive "Eddie the Engine".
 
With the expansion of the fleet, names have become harder to choose, and the fleet now features "Tuula Karina" (Finnish), "Angharad" (Welsh), "Anstice" and "Saoirse Erin" (Irish, meaning 'Free Ireland'). Currently the vehicles with the shortest and longest names are "Nia" and "Gladys Duchess of Overton", both on Scania R 420s.
 
There are some exceptions to the female naming convention (including Eddie the Engine). In 2005, in celebration of twenty years of Transformers, Stobart named a MAN tractor "Optimus Prime" and recently during the filming of a television series entitled Eddie Stobart: Trucks & Trailers a Volvo FH12 was christened "Valentino" after Valentino Rossi, the legendary Italian motorcycle racer, which caused a furore among spotters.

The company has a static Volvo FH in the "Glasshouse" at their Crick depot which is named in honour of fusilier "Lee Rigby".

Paint job history

The first truck bought by Eddie Stobart in 1960 was painted post office red and Brunswick Green, with yellow lettering. With subsequent vehicles the dark red was changed to a regular red, and the dark green was changed to a mixture of dark and bright green. The white remained the same.

Stobart Rail Freight

Eddie Stobart Logisics operates some rail-based services, both for freight as the Stobart Rail service, and (formerly) for passengers. For rail freight transport, the group owns warehousing at the rail connected Daventry International Railfreight Terminal (DIRFT), and owns the rail connected Widnes Intermodal Rail Depot.

Stobart Ports
O'Connor Group Management Ltd (trading as Stobart Ports) is the ports division of the Stobart Group. It owns a site in Widnes, Cheshire.

Widnes inland port and industrial park
Stobart has a lease on its industrial and office headquarters complex in Widnes.

Former operations

Rail tours

The Stobart Group briefly entered the passenger railtour market, through the Stobart Pullman, which was a re-branding of the Hertfordshire Rail Tours business inherited from Victa Westlink Rail, a joint venture between its Westlink subsidiary and Victa Railfreight. Traction was provided by Direct Rail Services using Stobart branded carriages. It was launched in February 2008.

Brand promotion
Eddie Stobart Promotions Ltd have various Brand Promotion services, such as the Stobart Members Club, Stobart Fest, Stobart Sponsorship and Stobart Motorsport. In 2005 and from 2007 to 2016 Eddie Stobart was recognised as a UK Superbrand by Superbrands Ltd.

Stobart Members Club
The tradition of naming Eddie Stobart lorry cabins with female names, combined with a very distinctive livery, has led members of the general public to "collect" sightings of Stobart lorries. This has occurred to the extent that a fan club was formed, eventually supported by the company which arranges depot tours and lorry rides, and sells model lorries etc.

Sponsorship
Since the takeover of Eddie Stobart by WA Developments in 2004 and its subsequent listing on the London Stock Exchange in 2007, Stobart has taken to a high-profile sponsorship programme, including:
 Stobart Stadium Halton, formerly Halton Stadium, the home of Widnes Vikings
  Manor House Stables LLP - yard sponsor, home to racehorse trainer Tom Dascombe
 The Rugby Super League

In popular culture
Channel 5 and Princess Productions released a program dedicated to the Stobart group, Eddie Stobart: Trucks & Trailers, which first aired on 24 September 2010.
 
The Stobart Group was featured on Top Gear in 1995, when presenter Tony Mason visited the company's Carlisle headquarters. Another appearance was made on Top Gear during the Reliant Robin rocket challenge. The Reliant was transported to the launch site on a flatbed Stobart truck to Richard Hammond and James May.
 
A one-off TV show was produced for ITV4 called Eddie Stobart - Smart Truckers. Narrated by Paddy McGuinness, the show included the boss William Stobart doing deliveries to distribution centres and the firm's race horses.
 
A CD was produced called Eddie Stobart Trucking Songs. The CD features all the truckers' favourite rock songs and artists including Queen, Fleetwood Mac and Motorhead.
 
The Somerset-based Scrumpy and Western band The Wurzels recorded a new song, "I wanna be an Eddie Stobart Driver".
 
In 2001, an animated series called Steady Eddie was released on home video by Contender Entertainment Group. It was based on the books by Linda Jennings. The series features characters such as Steady Eddie, the protagonist, Oliver Overdrive, Steady Eddie's arch-rival, Jock the Tanker and Lorretta Lorry, Steady Eddie's friends, and Freddie Forklift, a forklift who works in the yard making deliveries to Steady Eddie.

Gallery

See also
Stobart Motorsport
Stobart M-Sport Ford Rally Team

References

External links

 Eddie Stobart Logistics website
 Corporate history of Eddie Stobart Logistics
 Eddie Stobart fan club official website

Transport operators of the United Kingdom
Logistics companies of the United Kingdom
Companies based in Warrington